The 2022 World Cadet, Junior and U21 Karate Championships, was a karate event held in Konya, Turkey from 26 to 30 October 2022.

Age divisions 
Cadets 14-16 / Juniors 16-18 / Espoirs 18-21

Medal table

U-21

Men

Women

Junior

Men

Women

Cadet

Men

Women

Participating nations 
1779 athletes from 98 countries participated:

 (6)
 (29)
 (7)
 (14)
 (25)
 (16)
 (28)
 (17)
 (1)
 (33)
 (35)
 (15)
 (4)
 (34)
 (21)
 (33)
 (24)
 (3)
 (37)
 (2)
 (23)
 (25)
 (24)
 (7)
 (36)
 (2)
 (27)
 (10)
 (5)
 (37)
 (17)
 (35)
 (33)
 (1)
 (20)
 (26)
 (3)
 (25)
 (17)
 (16)
 (12)
 (37)
 (13)
 (38)
 (39)
 (22)
 (34)
 (19)
 (23)
 (12)
 (21)
 (4)
 (7)
 (10)
 (2)
 (6)
 (10)
 (32)
 (3)
 (27)
 (27)
 (2)
 (19)
 (15)
 (34)
 (2)
 (7)
 (3)
 (10)
 (10)
 (1)
 (30)
 (27)
 (2)
 (2)
 (33)
 (1)
 (20)
 (14)
 (8)
 (34)
 (2)
 (33)
 (21)
 (23)
 (38)
 (9)
 (19)
 (8)
 (14)
 (39)
 (33)
 (2)
 (36)
 (17)
 (24)
 (12)
 (4)

References

External links
Official website
Results book

U21
U21, Junior and Cadet World Championships
International karate competitions hosted by Turkey
Sport in Konya
Karate
Karate